Theodore B. Werner (June 2, 1892 – January 24, 1989) was a U.S. Democratic politician who served as a member of Congress from South Dakota.

Early life and education
Werner was born in Ossian, Iowa to German immigrants. He attended parochial schools in Iowa, after which he studied law in Illinois and Wisconsin.

Career
In 1909 Werner moved to Rapid City, South Dakota, where he became involved in the newspaper and commercial printing businesses. He became editor and publisher of the weekly Gate City Guide in 1912, and continued as publisher until 1965.

Political career
He was Rapid City's Postmaster from 1915 to 1923.  He was a City Commissioner from 1927 to 1930, and served as Rapid City's Mayor in 1929 and 1930.  In 1930 he was an unsuccessful candidate for Congress.

In 1932 Werner was elected to the United States House of Representatives.  He was reelected in 1934 and served from March 4, 1933 to January 3, 1937.  He lost his 1936 bid for reelection to Francis H. Case.

In 1947 Werner was appointed United States Marshal for South Dakota, and he served until 1951.

He died in Rapid City on January 24, 1989, and was buried in Rapid City's Mountain View Cemetery.

Sources

Theodore B. Werner at United States Marshals Service
Theodore B. Werner at Rapid City Public Library

References

External links

1892 births
1989 deaths
20th-century American politicians
20th-century American newspaper editors
20th-century American newspaper publishers (people)
South Dakota postmasters
Mayors of Rapid City, South Dakota
United States Marshals
Democratic Party members of the United States House of Representatives from South Dakota
American people of German descent
Burials in South Dakota
People from Winneshiek County, Iowa